William McArthur (17 August 1870 – 1948) was a Scottish footballer who played in the Football League for Bolton Wanderers and Leicester Fosse, and in the Scottish Football League with Dundee.

References

1870 births
1948 deaths
Scottish footballers
English Football League players
Association football forwards
Sunderland Albion F.C. players
Middlesbrough Ironopolis F.C. players
Bolton Wanderers F.C. players
Leicester City F.C. players
Dundee F.C. players
Brighton United F.C. players
Worthing F.C. players